Mark Lewis may refer to:

Entertainment
Mark Lewis (artist) (born 1958), Canadian artist and film-maker
Mark Lewis (storyteller) (1954–2014), American storyteller
Mark Lewis (filmmaker) (born 1958), Australian documentary film and television producer
Mark Lewis (music producer), American hard rock/heavy metal music producer

Sports
Mark Lewis (rugby union, born 1889) (1889–1968), Wales international rugby player
Mark Lewis (tennis) (born 1961), New Zealand tennis player
Mark Lewis (tight end) (born 1961), National Football League tight end 
Mark Lewis (baseball) (born 1969), infielder in Major League Baseball
Mark Lewis (kicker) (born 1979), Arena Football League placekicker
Mark Lewis (rugby union, born 1982), rugby union player
Mark Lewis (beach volleyball) (born 1980), Jamaican beach volleyball player
Mark Lewis (announcer), public address announcer for the National Hockey League's Edmonton Oilers
Mark Lewis (cricketer) (born 1987), English cricketer

Other
Mark Lewis (politician) (born 1957), Australian politician
Mark Edward Lewis (born 1954), American historian of ancient China
Mark J. Lewis (born 1962), Chief Scientist of the U.S. Air Force
Mark A. Lewis (born 1962), Canadian mathematician and biologist
Mark E. Lewis (engineer), American industrial engineer